Greatest Hits is the first greatest hits collection by American country music artist Ronnie Milsap. It was released in 1980 by RCA Records . The album's only single, "Smoky Mountain Rain," reached Number One on both the Billboard Hot Country Singles and Easy Listening charts. The album has been certified 2× Platinum by the RIAA for shipments of over 2 million copies.

Track listing

Original LP track listing
The original LP, cassette, and 8-track had a slightly different track listing:
"Smoky Mountain Rain"
"(I'd Be) A Legend in My Time"
"(I'm a) Stand by My Woman Man"
"I Hate You"
"Pure Love"
"It Was Almost Like a Song"
"Daydreams About Night Things"
"Let's Take the Long Way Around the World"
"Let My Love Be Your Pillow"
"Please Don't Tell Me How the Story Ends"
"Back on My Mind Again"
"What a Difference You've Made in My Life"

Charts

Weekly charts

Year-end charts

References

1980 greatest hits albums
Ronnie Milsap albums
RCA Records compilation albums